Chiddingstone Causeway is a village  west of Tonbridge in Kent, England. It is within the Sevenoaks local government district. It is in the civil parish of Chiddingstone.

The village is served by Penshurst Station on the Redhill to Tonbridge Line with trains running hourly between London Victoria and Tonbridge via East Croydon.  Connections for Gatwick Airport can be made from this service by changing at Redhill. Penshurst Airfield, which was in operation from 1916 to 1936, and again from 1940 to 1946 as RAF Penshurst, was within ¼ mile (400 m) of the station.

The village is also served by the 231 and 233 bus routes linking Lingfield, Edenbridge, and Tunbridge Wells via Bidborough  The current service contract is run by Metrobus and there is no Sunday or Bank Holiday service.

In the centre of the village is 'The Little Brown Jug' public house.

St. Luke's church is a Church of England church on the Tonbridge Road, jost over a hundred metres east of the pub.

There is a war memorial outside St. Luke's church.

Nearest Settlements

The hamlet of Charcott is half a kilometre to the north. The pub there is the Greyhound.

References

External links

Villages in Kent